Six Days on the Road is the twelfth studio album by American country music band Sawyer Brown. It was released in 1997 on Curb Records. Its title track and lead-off single is a cover of the Dave Dudley hit from 1963. This cover reached number 13 on the Billboard country charts. Following this song was another cover, this time of "This Night Won't Last Forever", which was a pop hit for Bill LaBounty in 1978 and later for Michael Johnson in 1979. Sawyer Brown's cover was a number 6 country hit in late 1997. Also released from this album were "Another Side" and "Small Talk", both of which failed to make the country Top 40.

Content
"The Nebraska Song" is a tribute to Nebraska Cornhuskers quarterback Brook Berringer, who was killed in a plane crash in 1996. The song is track number 18, the same as Berringer's jersey number. (To make this possible, tracks 13 through 17 are blank.)

Critical reception
Bob Cannon of New Country magazine rated the album 3.5 stars out of 5. He wrote that the band "serve up a batch of tunes that, while never matching the emotional depth of 1992's 'All These Years', is a top-shelf collection that stresses the group's versatility." He praised the rock influences on some tracks and called "The Nebraska Song" "intimate", criticizing only the cover of "This Night Won't Last Forever" by saying that it was "as bland as the original."

Track listing
"Another Side" (Mark Miller) – 4:11
"Talkin' 'bout You" (Mark Alan Springer) – 3:39
"This Night Won't Last Forever" (Bill LaBounty, Roy Freeland) – 3:56
"Six Days on the Road" (Earl Green, Carl Montgomery) – 2:53
"Small Talk" (Mac McAnally, Miller) – 3:42
"With This Ring" (McAnally) – 3:12
"Transistor Rodeo" (Miller) – 3:06
"Night and Day" (McAnally) – 3:35
"Half a Heart" (Gregg Hubbard, Miller) – 3:02
"Between You and Paradise" (Neal Coty, Springer) – 4:15
"A Love Like This" (Miller, Bill Shore) – 2:50
"Every Twist and Turn" (Hubbard, Miller) – 3:11
 (blank track) – 0:04
 (blank track) – 0:04
 (blank track) – 0:04
 (blank track) – 0:04
 (blank track) – 0:05
"The Nebraska Song" (Miller) – 2:53

Personnel 
As listed in liner notes

Sawyer Brown
 Mark Miller – lead vocals
 Gregg "Hobie" Hubbard – keyboards, backing vocals 
 Duncan Cameron – lead guitars, backing vocals
 Jim Scholten – bass 
 Joe Smyth – drums

Additional Musicians
 Clayton Ivey – keyboards, acoustic piano
 Mike Lawler – synthesizers 
 Steve Nathan – keyboards
 Matt Rollings – acoustic piano
 Scott Emerick – acoustic guitar
 Joe Erkman – electric guitar
 Mac McAnally – acoustic guitar
 Rick Vito – electric guitar, slide guitar
 Dan Dugmore – lap steel guitar
 Paul Franklin – steel guitar
 JayDee Maness – steel guitar 
 Rob Hajacos – fiddle
 Roger Hawkins – drums, percussion

Additional vocals (background hollers and caterwauling) on "Six Days on the Road"
 Mark Miller, Gregg "Hobie" Hubbard, Mac McAnally, Mitch DeNeui, Frank Miller and Alan Schulman

Production 
 Mark Miller – producer 
 Mac McAnally – producer
 Alan Schulman – recording, mixing 
 Brian Tankersley – additional recording, mixing 
 Greg Pace – additional recording
 Kent Bruce – recording assistant 
 Ken Hutton – recording assistant 
 Steve Lowery – recording assistant 
 Sandy Jenkins – mix assistant 
 Denny Purcell – mastering 
 Jonathan Russell – mastering assistant 
 Monica Mercer – art direction, design 
 John Chiasson – photography

Chart performance

References

External links
[ Six Days on the Road] at Allmusic

1997 albums
Curb Records albums
Sawyer Brown albums
Albums produced by Mac McAnally